Ben Morris (born 13 December 1991) is an English rugby union player. His playing position is Flanker.  His current club is Birmingham Moseley Rugby Club

References

External links
Wasps Profile
ESPN Profile
Ultimate Rugby Profile

1991 births
Living people
English rugby union players
Rugby union players from Lancaster
Wasps RFC players
Rugby union flankers